Crypts are anatomical structures that are narrow but deep invaginations into a larger structure.

One common type of anatomical crypt is the Crypts of Lieberkühn.  However, it is not the only type: some types of tonsils also have crypts.  Because these crypts allow external access to the deep portions of the tonsils, these tonsils are more vulnerable to infection.

References

External links
  - "Lymphoid Tissues and Organs: tonsil"
 Histology of crypt of tonsil at siumed.edu

Anatomy